All in Sport was a syndicated newspaper comic strip created in the late 1940s by the cartoonist Chester "Chet" Adams, who earlier had drawn the Gigs and Gags feature during World War II.

It usually was featured in the sports section of newspapers. The syndicated daily strip ran from April 18, 1960, to March 8, 1974, and the Sunday strip began December 29, 1963, continuing until February 17, 1974.

See also
Tank McNamara

References

Sources
Strickler, Dave. Syndicated Comic Strips and Artists, 1924-1995.

American comic strips
Sports comics
Comic strips started in the 1940s
1974 comics endings